Charles Eglerton Hyatt (14 February 1931 – 01 January 2007) was a Jamaican actor, playwright, director, author and broadcaster. Hyatt was best known as a character actor and comedian who appeared in numerous films and television shows, beginning in the 1960s.

Early life 
Hyatt was born in Kingston, Jamaica, to Herbert Hyatt, a taxi-driver, and Ruth Burke, a homemaker. He attended St Aloysious Boys' School and St Simon’s College.

Career 
After making his movie debut in the 1965 film A High Wind in Jamaica, Hyatt had notable performances in the films The Bushbaby (1969), Crossplot (1969), Freelance (1971), Love Thy Neighbour (1973), Club Paradise (1986), Milk and Honey (1988), The Mighty Quinn (1989), Cool Runnings (1993) and Almost Heaven (2005).

Hyatt was the recipient of Jamaica's national honour of Order of Distinction (OD), and was awarded the Institute of Jamaica Centenary Medal and the silver Musgrave Medal.

Personal life 
Hyatt was married to Vera Hyatt, an art historian, museologist, and former Deputy Director of the National Gallery of Jamaica. They had three children together, including Charlene Hyatt, now known as the actress Michael Hyatt. The marriage ended in divorce.

Hyatt then married Marjorie Hyatt. Hyatt died in Florida, United States, of lung cancer on 1 January 2007.

Partial filmography
 A High Wind in Jamaica (1965) – Pirate
 The Bushbaby (1969) – Gideon
 Crossplot (1969) – President Maudula
 Freelance (1971) – McNair
 Love Thy Neighbour (1973) – Joe Reynolds
 The Marijuana Affair (1975)
 Club Paradise (1986) – Mr. Banks
 Milk and Honey (1988) – Village Preacher
 The Mighty Quinn (1989) – Security Guard
 Cool Runnings (1993) – Whitby Bevil – Sr.
 Almost Heaven (2005) – Doctor (final film role)

References

External links

Official website — Charles Hyatt Foundation

1931 births
2007 deaths
20th-century Jamaican male actors
People from Kingston, Jamaica
Deaths from lung cancer
21st-century Jamaican male actors
Jamaican male film actors
Recipients of the Musgrave Medal
Recipients of the Order of Distinction